Kim Mai Guest is an American voice actress of European and Vietnamese descent who is known to speak fluent French and Italian. She is best known for her role as Mei Ling in Metal Gear.

Selected filmography

Voice roles of Animation

Anime dubbing

Films

Video games

 .hack series - Subaru
 Anarchy Reigns – Sasha Ivanoff, Jeannie Caxton
 Baten Kaitos Origins – Pieda
 Dead Island – Xian Mei
 Dead Island: Riptide – Xian Mei 
 Dead Rising – Isabela Keyes
 Diablo III: Reaper of Souls – Additional Voices
 Dirge of Cerberus: Final Fantasy VII – Shalua Rui
 Eternal Darkness: Sanity's Requiem – Ellia the Dancer, Xel'lotath
 EOE: Eve of Extinction – Zera
 F.E.A.R. 3 – Jin Sun-Kwon
 Final Fantasy Type-0 HD – Celestia
 Final Fantasy XIII-2 – Alyssa Zaidelle
 Final Fantasy VII Remake – Additional Voices
 Ghostwire: Tokyo – Woman A, Woman C
 Gladius – Ejii, Kareema
 Grandia II – Tio, High Priestess Selene, Client's Daughter
 Gurumin: A Monstrous Adventure - Pino, Chucky, Pamela
 Halo Wars – Ellen Anders
 Heroes of the Storm – Li Li
 Jade Empire – Dawn Star
 Lightning Returns: Final Fantasy XIII – Additional Voices
 Lineage II – Human Mage
 Lost Odyssey – Sarah Sisulart
 Marvel: Ultimate Alliance – Crystal, Psylocke
 Mass Effect – Hana Murakami, Maeko Matsuo
 Maximo: Ghosts to Glory – Sophia, Queen, Aurora Lee
 Metal Gear series – Mei-Ling
 Naruto Shippūden: Ultimate Ninja Heroes 3 – Tsukino
 Need for Speed: Carbon – Yumi
 Ninja Blade – Female High School Student
 No More Heroes – Holly Summers
 Perfect Dark Zero – Mai Hem
 Power Rangers: Super Legends – Mighty Morphin Pink Ranger & Trakeena
 Ratchet & Clank: Going Commando – Trailer PA
 Rise of the Kasai – Tati
 Saints Row IV – Additional voices
 Scooby-Doo! Unmasked – Nikki Starlight, Maggie Xi, Kung-Fu Maiden, Fire-Breathing Groupie
 Super Smash Bros. Brawl – Mei Ling (voice cameo)
 Super Smash Bros. Ultimate – Mei Ling 
 Syphon Filter: The Omega Strain, Syphon Filter: Dark Mirror, Syphon Filter: Logan's Shadow – Lian Xing
 Style Savvy: Styling Star – Voice
 Tales of Symphonia – Martel / Tabatha
 Tom Clancy's EndWar – Additional Voices
 Warhawk (FMV sequences) – Commander Shayla Jassic
 WET – Tarantula
 World of Warcraft: Legion – LiLi Stormstout, Thisalee Crow
 Xenosaga II – Juli Mizrahi, Nephilim, Newscaster, Announcer
 Xenosaga III – Juli Mizrahi, Nephilim
 X-Men Legends II: Rise of Apocalypse – Lady Deathstrike, Shadowcat
 X-Men: The Official Game – Shadowcat

Audiobooks
God Gave Us You by Lisa T. Bergren
Anna and the French Kiss by Stephanie Perkins
Their Fractured Light by Amie Kaufman & Meagan Spooner
One of Us Is Lying by Karen M. McManus
Flamecaster by Cinda Williams Chima
Shadowcaster by Cinda Williams Chima
 Dragon Pearl by Yoon Ha Lee
Wait for Me by An Na
Each Little Bird that Sings by Deborah Wiles
Starry River of the Sky by Grace Lin
Brutal by Michael Harmon
Incarceron by Catherine Fisher
Song of the Crimson Flower by Julie C. Dao
Two Nights by Kathy Reichs
The year of the dog by Grace Lin
Sour Heart by Jenny Zhang
Orphan Island by Laurel Snyder
Born to Fly: The First Women's Air Race Across America by Steve Sheinkin
What's Left Of Me by Kat Zhang
Once We Were by Kat Zhang
Steel Crow Saga by Paul Krueger

References

External links

Q&A with Penguin Random House
Interview with Voice Actor Kim Mai Guest with Sarah Cross

American people of Vietnamese descent
American video game actresses
American voice actresses
Living people
20th-century American actresses
21st-century American actresses
1969 births